Setälä is a Finnish surname. Notable people with the surname include:

Eemil Nestor Setälä (1864–1935), Finnish politician 
Jukka Setälä (born 1967), Finnish designer
Päivi Setälä (1943–2014), Finnish historian and professor
Toivo Aalto-Setälä (1896–1977), Finnish lawyer and politician

Finnish-language surnames